Believe It is the first album by The New Tony Williams Lifetime, released in 1975 on Columbia Records. The New Lifetime was a jazz fusion band formed by the drummer Tony Williams with Allan Holdsworth on guitar, Alan Pasqua on keyboards and Tony Newton on bass.

Reception
AllMusic awarded the album with 4 out of 5 stars. The Rolling Stone Jazz Record Guide also awarded 4 out of 5 stars and in his review, John Swenson describes the albums Believe It and Million Dollar Legs as "both funk fusion delights featuring the playing of ex-Soft Machine axeman Allan Holdsworth".

The compositions "Fred", "Proto Cosmos" and "Red Alert" are also featured on the  Allan Holdsworth DVD Live at Yoshi's, released in 2007. Holdsworth has often stated that his time with the drummer was the most influential formative stage of his career.

Track listing 
 "Snake Oil" (Tony Newton) — 6:30
 "Fred" (Allan Holdsworth) — 6:48
 "Proto-Cosmos" (Alan Pasqua) — 4:02
 "Red Alert" (Newton) — 4:39
 "Wildlife" (Tony Williams) — 5:22
 "Mr Spock" (Holdsworth) — 6:15
 "Celebration" (Williams) — [Bonus Track] 4:01
 "Letsby" (Holdsworth) — [Bonus Track] 6:34

Personnel 
 Allan Holdsworth – guitar 
 Alan Pasqua – keyboards 
 Tony Newton – bass 
 Tony Williams – drums
Technical
 Art Direction: Ed Lee
 Photography: Eric Meola
 Hand Lettering: Gerard Huerta

References 

The Tony Williams Lifetime albums
1975 albums
Albums produced by Bruce Botnick
Columbia Records albums